Lichtenstein is a town in the Zwickau district, in Saxony, Germany. It is situated 11 km northeast of Zwickau, and 22 km southwest of Chemnitz. It was owned by the House of Schönburg from 1286 until 1945.

See also

References 

Zwickau (district)